Jonathan "John" Aprea (born March 4, 1941) is an American actor and comedian, best known for his role as the young Salvatore Tessio in The Godfather: Part II (1974) and on television as Lucas Castigliano in Another World from 1989 to 1992. He played Lee in Tales from the Darkside Going Native (1988) series 4, episode 17. He also co-starred with Lee Horsley in Matt Houston during the 1980s, and appeared on the TV series Full House (1987–1995) and the spin-off series Fuller House (2016). He guest-starred on the HBO series The Sopranos (1999).

Biography

Aprea was born Jonathan Aprea in Englewood, New Jersey, on March 4, 1941. He has one daughter, Nicole Alexandra Aprea (born 1989).

Filmography

 1968 Bullitt as Killer
 1970 The Grasshopper as The Ice Pack
 1970 The Dark Side of Tomorrow as Jim Jeffers
 1972 Sweet Kill as Richard
 1973 The Seven-Ups as Killer (uncredited)
 1974 Caged Heat as Dream Man
 1974 The Godfather: Part II as Young Salvatore Tessio
 1975 The Stepford Wives as Young Cop
 1975 Crazy Mama as Marvin
 1980 The Idolmaker as Mario Vacaro
 1982 Comeback as Lawyer
 1984 The Act as Ron
 1986 American Anthem as Mr. Tevere
 1988 Picasso Trigger as Salazar / Picasso Trigger
 1989 Savage Beach as Captain Andreas
 1991 New Jack City as Don Armeteo
 1991 Another World (TV series) as Lucas
 1992 Confessions of a Male Prostitute (short film) as Nick 1994 CyberTracker as Senator Dilly
 1995 To the Limit as Philly Bambino
 1987-1995 Full House as Nick Katsopolis
 1996 Sunset Park as Dominic
 1997 The Game as Power Executive
 1997 My Brother Jack as Barry Freed
 1998 Deadly Ransom as Mr. Merlin
 1998 Dead Man on Campus as Mr. Frederickson
 1999 The Sopranos as U.S. Attorney
 2000 Brother as Mafia Boss Geppetti
 2002 The Streetsweeper as Unknown
 2004 The Manchurian Candidate as Rear Admiral Glick
 2004 Lost Focus as Max Moore
 2012 Dirty People as Sollie
 2012 Mirror Image as Alex Ricci
 2013 After You as Jerry Masselin
 2013 On Cinema as himself
 2014 Snapshot as Joseph Simmons
 2015 Sharkskin as Mike Esposito
 2016 Stevie D as Angelo DiMarco
 2014-2017 Decker as General Jeffrey Cotter
 2017 Fuller House'' as Nick Katsopolis

References

External links
 
 

1941 births
Living people
American male film actors
American male soap opera actors
Male actors from New Jersey
People from Englewood, New Jersey